The Lo Nuestro Award for Collaboration of the Year  is an honor presented annually by American network Univision. The Lo Nuestro Awards were first awarded in 1989 and were established to recognize the most talented performers of Latin music. The nominees and winners were originally selected by a voting poll conducted among program directors of Spanish-language radio stations in the United States and also based on chart performance on Billboard Latin music charts, with the results being tabulated and certified by the accounting firm Deloitte. At the present time, the winners are selected by the audience through an online survey. The trophy awarded is shaped in the form of a treble clef.

In 2010, the Collaboration of the Year (an all-genre award) was included in the General Field of the Lo Nuestro Awards, and in the first time that was presented the nominees included "Aquí Estoy Yo" by Puerto-Rican American pop singer Luis Fonsi featuring Aleks Syntek, David Bisbal and Noel Schajris; "All Up 2 You" by American bachata band Aventura featuring Akon and Wisin y Yandel; "Eso de Quererte" by Mexican banda performer Fidel Rueda and Los Buitres; "Imparable" by Puerto-Rican American singer-songwriter Tommy Torres and Jesse & Joy; and Puerto-Rican American urban band "No Hay Nadie Como Tú" by Calle 13 featuring Café Tacuba. "Aquí Estoy Yo" earned the award, and also was the recipient of the Latin Grammy Award for Song of the Year. The following year, Spanish singer-songwriter Enrique Iglesias won the category with "Cuando Me Enamoro", a collaboration with Dominican performer Juan Luis Guerra, and also received the Hot Latin Song of the Year accolade at the Billboard Latin Music Awards.

Puerto-Rican reggaeton performer Daddy Yankee won in 2012 for his collaboration with American singer Prince Royce titled "Ven Conmigo", which was also nominated for a Latin Grammy Award for Best Urban Song. In 2013, Prince Royce became the most awarded performer in the category, winning for the second consecutive year, since his collaboration with Mexican band Maná titled "El Verdadero Amor Perdona" won for collaboration of the year and also reached number-one in the Billboard Latin Songs chart.

In 2015, the Collaboration of the Year Award was separated into four fields: Pop, Tropical, Regional Mexican, and Urban. The following year it returned to the General Field and was awarded to Nicky Jam and Enrique Iglesias for "El Perdón" and in 2017 nominations were presented in the General and Urban Field.

Winners and nominees
Listed below are the winners of the award for each year, as well as the other nominees.

See also
 Billboard Latin Music Awards

References

Collaboration
Musical collaboration awards
Awards established in 2010